Charles Howard Crane (August 13, 1885 – August 14, 1952) was an American architect who was primarily active in Detroit, Michigan. His designs include Detroit's Fox Theatre and Olympia Stadium, as well as LeVeque Tower in Columbus, Ohio, which remains that city's second tallest building.

Biography

Born in Hartford, Connecticut, Crane moved to Detroit in 1904. He worked as a draftsman for several architectural firms, including Albert Kahn Associates, Smith, Hinchman & Grylls, and the office of Gustave A. Mueller, before opening his own office in 1908.

Like Thomas W. Lamb and John Eberson, Crane specialized in the design of movie palaces in North America. Crane's career would include some 250 theaters in total, with 62 of them in the Detroit area. His 5174-seat Detroit Fox Theatre was the largest of the Fox Theatres. The 4,500 seat Fox Theatre in St. Louis was its slightly smaller architectural near twin. These were considered to have been his architectural masterpieces. Among the five massive Fox theatres, Crane also designed the Brooklyn Fox (4,088 seats, razed).

Crane also designed Olympia Stadium (Detroit Olympia), which eventually had seating for 13,375 plus standing room for 3,300. Olympia, used by the Detroit Red Wings, was razed in 1987.

Crane also designed many office buildings. Most of his many downtown Detroit movie palaces had attached office towers that he designed (the Fox, United Artists, State, Capitol). However, Crane's office tower masterpiece is the 47 story 555 ft. tall LeVeque Tower in Columbus, Ohio.

Due to the 1929 Great Depression, Crane's theatre and office building commissions dried up. He became disillusioned and in 1930 moved to London, England, although he kept his Detroit office open for many years after moving. Crane designed many cinemas across Britain, but in much tamer designs than his American movie palaces.

Crane's most famous U.K. commission was Earls Court Exhibition Centre, an Art Moderne convention center that opened in 1937. It closed in 2014 and was demolished between 2015 and 2017.

Crane returned to visit Detroit once or twice a year until World War II. He then remained in London, where he died and was buried in 1952. His namesake descendants (C. Howard Crane III, et al.) now live in the Detroit area.

Crane-designed buildings

All buildings are located in Detroit, unless otherwise indicated.

Majestic Theatre, 1915
Liberty/Paramount Theatre, Youngstown, Ohio, 1918
The Metropolitan 1919, Winnipeg Manitoba Canada
Orchestra Hall, 1919
Old Walkerville Theatre, Walkerville, Ontario, Canada, 1920
Macomb Music Theatre, Mount Clemens, Michigan, 1921
Virginia Theatre, Champaign, Illinois, 1921
Detroit Opera House, 1922
Temple Beth-El conversion to theatre, 1922
World Theater, Omaha, Nebraska, 1922, renamed in 1935 to Omaha Theater, razed in 1980
Detroit Institute of Arts (as consulting architect), 1923–27
Lafayette Building, 1923 (razed, 2010)
Warner Theatre (formerly the Earle Theatre), Washington, D.C., 1924
August Wilson Theatre (formerly the Guild Theatre and the Virginia Theatre), New York City, 1925
The Fillmore Detroit (formerly the State Theatre), 1925
Film Exchange Building, 1926
Detroit Olympia, 1927 (home to the Detroit Red Wings until 1979; razed, 1987)
United Artists Theater, Los Angeles, 1927
LeVeque Tower, Columbus, Ohio, 1927
United Artists Theatre Building, 1928
Fox Theatre, 1928
Fox Theatre, St. Louis, 1929
Earls Court Exhibition Centre, London, England, 1937 (demolished 2014)
Vickers-Armstrongs (Aircraft) Ltd headquarters, Brooklands, Weybridge, England, 1938

See also
Architecture of metropolitan Detroit
Performing arts in Detroit

References

Further reading

External links
List of cinemas designed by C. Howard Crane
Detroit Symphony Orchestra Hall
Detroit Opera House

American theatre architects
1885 births
1952 deaths
Architects from Detroit
Historicist architects
People associated with the Detroit Institute of Arts
Architects from Hartford, Connecticut
American expatriates in the United Kingdom
20th-century American architects